Magic is a French music magazine which is released on a monthly basis. It was formed out of the ashes of a small fanzine produced by music aficionados from France in 1995. The magazine's target readership is composed of young adults, students and young professionals who are keen to pursue the latest fashionable trend in music (and other forms of culture).

References

External links
Official Magic website

1995 establishments in France
French-language magazines
Magazines established in 1995
Magazines published in Paris
Monthly magazines published in France
Music magazines published in France